Ajingi is a Local Government Area in Kano State, Nigeria. Its headquarters are in the town of Ajingi.

It has an area of 714 km and a population of 174,137 at the 2006 census.

The postal code of the area is 713.

References

Local Government Areas in Kano State